Zhibek Kulambayeva (born 26 March 2000) is a Kazakhstani tennis player.

Kulambayeva achieved career-high WTA rankings of world No. 414 in singles and No. 183 in doubles.

She made her debut for the Kazakhstan Fed Cup team in 2018.

In 2021, Kulambayeva became the person with the most trophies in the ITF Women's Tour with one singles and nine doubles titles, a total of ten titles.

In 2023, Kulambayeva competed with the Kazakhstan team in the United Cup.

ITF Circuit finals

Singles: 7 (2 titles, 4 runner–ups, 1 not played)

Doubles: 29 (19 titles, 10 runner–ups)

Notes

References

External links
 
 
 

2000 births
Living people
Kazakhstani female tennis players
Tennis players at the 2018 Asian Games
Asian Games competitors for Kazakhstan
21st-century Kazakhstani women